Đỗ Minh Quân (7 January 1984) is a retired Vietnamese tennis player. He won Vietnam Tennis Championship for ten times in singles and doubles. He has been part of the Vietnam Davis Cup team from 2003 until 2015.

References

External links
 
 

1984 births
Living people
Vietnamese male tennis players
Tennis players at the 2006 Asian Games
Tennis players at the 2010 Asian Games
Sportspeople from Ho Chi Minh City
Southeast Asian Games bronze medalists for Vietnam
Southeast Asian Games medalists in tennis
Competitors at the 2007 Southeast Asian Games
Asian Games competitors for Vietnam
20th-century Vietnamese people
21st-century Vietnamese people